Xeniaria bicornis is a species of earwigs, in the genus Xeniaria, family Arixeniidae, the suborder Arixeniina, and the order Dermaptera. It is one of three species in the genus Xeniaria.

References 

Insects described in 1974
Arixeniina